2020 Quetta bombing may refer to:

January 2020 Quetta bombing
February 2020 Quetta bombing